The Nikšić–Podgorica railway is a railway connecting Montenegro's capital Podgorica and the country's second largest city, Nikšić. The line connects to the Belgrade–Bar railway and the Podgorica–Shkodër railway at Podgorica. It is operated by ŽICG.

Overview 

Nikšić–Podgorica is a  standard-gauge railway. The line has five stations (Nikšić, Ostrog, Danilovgrad, Spuž and Podgorica) and seven halts.

History 

The line was built as a narrow gauge  railway in 1948. It was connected to the preexisting Nikšić–Bileća line. In 1965, the line was upgraded to standard gauge. The extension to Bileća was decommissioned in 1976.

The railway has primarily been used for transport of bauxite ore from the Nikšić mine to the Podgorica Aluminium Plant. Passenger service was reintroduced in 2012.

In 2006, thorough reconstruction and electrification of the line begun, with consortium of Czech companies (OHL ŽS "Brno", AŽD and EŽ) undertaking the construction works. The reconstruction was scheduled to be completed in 2009, but was completed only in 2012, due to funding problems. The entire project had a cost close to €72 million.

The reconstructed railway was officially opened on 1 October 2012, with operating speeds increased to  range, and passenger service reintroduced. Three CAF Civity EMUs ordered by Railways of Montenegro specifically to serve this railway were scheduled to arrive in Montenegro in July 2013.

See also
 Rail transport in Montenegro

References

External links
Željeznička infrastruktura Crne Gore (in Montenegrin)

Railway lines in Montenegro
Railway lines opened in 1947
1947 establishments in Montenegro
760 mm gauge railways